Naphat Deeprasert (born August 7, 1996), formerly known as Todsawee Deeprasert, is a Thai professional footballer who plays for Phitsanulok in Thai League 3 as a midfielder.

Honours
Phitsanulok
 Thai League 3 Northern Region: 2022–23

References

External links

ทศวี ดีประเสริฐ(Todsawee Deeprasert) นักเตะสโมสรฟุตบอลระยอง เอฟซี ฤดูกาล 2020

1996 births
Living people
Association football midfielders
Naphat Deeprasert
Naphat Deeprasert
Naphat Deeprasert
Naphat Deeprasert
Naphat Deeprasert
Place of birth missing (living people)